Air Marshal Sean Keith Paul Reynolds,  is a senior Royal Auxiliary Air Force officer who serves as Air Officer for Northern Ireland.

RAF career
Reynolds was commissioned into the Royal Air Force on 8 June 1984. He was awarded the Distinguished Flying Cross for service during the Gulf War. He became station commander at RAF Odiham in September 2005. He went on to be Director of Finance and Military Capability (Air) in April 2009, Director of Strategy Management at the Ministry of Defence in March 2011, and Air Officer Commanding No. 2 Group in January 2013. He was appointed Deputy Commander (Personnel) at RAF Air Command in May 2016. He became Air Officer Northern Ireland as a member of the Royal Air Force Reserve on 1 January 2019.

Reynolds was appointed an Officer of the Order of the British Empire in recognition of services in Afghanistan on 29 April 2003, and advanced to Commander of the Order of the British Empire in the 2008 Birthday Honours. He was appointed a Companion of the Order of the Bath in the 2019 New Year Honours.

References

|-

Commanders of the Order of the British Empire
Living people
Companions of the Order of the Bath
Recipients of the Commendation for Valuable Service
Recipients of the Distinguished Flying Cross (United Kingdom)
Royal Air Force air marshals
Royal Air Force personnel of the Gulf War
Royal Air Force personnel of the Iraq War
Royal Air Force personnel of the War in Afghanistan (2001–2021)
Year of birth missing (living people)